Raven Edwards-Dowdall (born 14 May 2000) is a footballer who plays for Romanian club FC Carmen București in the Liga I. Born in Canada, she represents Guyana at the international level.

College career
Edwards-Dowdall attended college at Seneca College, where she played for the women's team. In 2022, she was named the OCAA Women's Indoor Championship MVP and OCAA Women's Indoor Championship Top Goalkeeper.

Club career
In 2022, she played for the North Toronto Nitros in League1 Ontario.

In March 2023, she signed with Romanian club FC Carmen București.

International career
In 2020, she represented Guyana U20 at the 2020 CONCACAF Women's U-20 Championship, being named to the national side for the first time.

In 2022, she was named to the Guyana.

References

External links
 

2000 births
Living people
Citizens of Guyana through descent
Guyanese women's footballers
Women's association football goalkeepers
Guyana women's international footballers
Canadian women's soccer players
Canadian sportspeople of Guyanese descent
League1 Ontario (women) players
North Toronto Nitros players
Seneca College alumni